Timewatch is a long-running British television series showing documentaries on historical subjects, spanning all human history. It was first broadcast on 29 September 1982 and is produced by the BBC.

The Timewatch brandname is used as a banner title in the UK, but many of the individual documentaries are unbranded with BBC continuity outside the domestic British market.

Episodes
Viewer figures are taken from the Broadcasters' Audience Research Board Ltd. website for the day that the episode was first aired.

2001

2002

2003

2004

2005

2006

2007

2008

2009

2010

2011

See also
 Time Team - a British Channel 4 programme focusing on archaeology

References

External links
 Official Timewatch Homepage at bbc.co.uk
 

1982 British television series debuts
1990s British television series
2000s British television series
BBC television documentaries about history